The Back Award, also referred to as the Back Grant, was first given by the Royal Geographical Society in 1882 for "applied or scientific geographical studies which make an outstanding contribution to the development of national or international public policy" 

It is named after the notable Arctic explorer Admiral Sir George Back.

Recipients

See also

 List of geography awards

References

Awards of Royal Geographical Society
Awards established in 1882